Les Nouvelles littéraires was a French literary and artistic newspaper created in October 1922 by the Éditions Larousse. It disappeared in 1985 after having taken the title .

History
René Minguet was its director from 1971 to 1975 followed by Philippe Tesson from 1975 to 1983.

The editors were successively Gilbert Charles, Frédéric Lefèvre from 1922 until 1949,  from 1949 to 1962, and  until its disestablishment in 1985.

The magazine, at first artistic and literary, became interested in cinema and science afterwards. It ceased publication from 1940 until 1945. In 1924, the newspaper published an appendix entitled L'Art vivant.

Some collaborators
 Raymond Woog
 Jean-Louis Ezine
 Michel Field
 Jeanne Cressanges
 Pierre Billard
 Pierrette Micheloud
 Pascal Mérigeau
 Maurice Féaudierre
 Madeleine Masson
Maryse Choisy

Sources
1973: D'une rive à l'autre, Georges Charensol, Mercure de France, 
2006: Gavroche, André Demonsais, L'Harmattan, series des poings et des roses

External links 
 Colloque "Les Nouvelles littéraires : une idée de littérature ?" Université de Franche-Comté, 17 septembre 2010
 ark:/12148/cb328268096/date Archives de Les Nouvelles littéraires on 
 Presse et revues, Les Nouvelles littéraires, artistiques et scientifiques list of issues available on 
 Les Nouvelles littéraires  on IMEC archives

1922 establishments in France
1985 disestablishments in France
Defunct literary magazines published in France
French-language magazines
Magazines established in 1922
Magazines disestablished in 1985
Magazines published in Paris
Monthly magazines published in France